The EF 70–210mm lens is a discontinued telephoto zoom lens made by Canon Inc. It came in two different versions.

Details 
The lens has an EF mount and works with EOS film and digital cameras.

The lens comes in two different versions:
 Canon EF 70–210mm 4 AFD (1987–1990)
 Canon EF 70–210mm 3.5–4.5 USM (introduced 1990)

The variable-aperture USM model utilizes a rotating ring instead of a push-pull system for adjusting zoom.

The lens was superseded by the 80–200mm lens and the 70–200mm lenses.

Specifications

References

External links

Canon EF lenses